Yvon Beliën (born 28 December 1993) is a Dutch volleyball player, who plays as a Center. She plays for River Volley Piacenza. In 2015, she played with the Dutch National Team at the 2015 European Games in Baku, Azerbaijan. In 2016, she helped the Netherlands reach their first Olympic semifinals at the 2016 Summer Olympics, finishing fourth.

Personal
Beliën has a sister Rian, who is 2,5 years older.

Awards

Individuals
2015 Montreux Volley Masters "Best Middle Blockers"

References

External links
FIVB profile

1993 births
Living people
Dutch women's volleyball players
Dutch expatriate sportspeople in Germany
Dutch expatriate sportspeople in Italy
Dutch expatriate sportspeople in Turkey
European Games competitors for the Netherlands
Expatriate volleyball players in Germany
Expatriate volleyball players in Italy
Expatriate volleyball players in Turkey
People from Cranendonck
Volleyball players at the 2015 European Games
Volleyball players at the 2016 Summer Olympics
Bursa Büyükşehir Belediyespor athletes
Beşiktaş volleyballers
Middle blockers
Olympic volleyball players of the Netherlands
Galatasaray S.K. (women's volleyball) players
Sportspeople from North Brabant